QRS may refer to:

 QRS complex
 QRS concordance
 QRS Music Technologies, recording and musical instrument manufacturer
 QR Sagittae, star also known as WR 124
 QRS Sunderland, former name of Newcastle Eagles basketball team